Queen of the Ring is a 6-episode South Korean television drama starring Kim Seul-gi and Ahn Hyo-seop. The drama is one of the "Three Color Fantasy" drama trilogy by MBC and Naver. The drama's color is Gold, It's previously occupied by Romance Full of Life (Green). It will air on Naver TV Cast every Tuesday at 0:00 (KST) starting from March 7, 2017 and on MBC every Thursday at 23:10 (KST) starting from March 9, 2017.

Plot 
Story about a girl Nan-hee (Kim Seul-gi) who does not believe in herself because she feels she does not look as pretty as others. One day she receives a ring which holds a family secret. Due to the magical ring, she gets Se-gun (Ahn Hyo-seop) who's a handsome guy but has a cold-blooded personality to see her as his ideal type.

Cast

Main 
 Kim Seul-gi as Mo Nan-hee
 Ahn Hyo-seop as Park Se-gun

Supporting 
 Yoon So-hee as Kang Mi-joo
 Hwang Jung-min as Moon Je-hwa
 Jeon No-min as Mo Joong-hun
 Lee Tae-sun as Byun Tae-hyun
 Choi Tae-hwan as Ma Deuk-chan
 Kim Min-young as Pi On-hwa
 Cho Soo-hyang as Girlfriend with a ring

Cameo 
 Kim So-hye as Park Se-gun's ex-girlfriend, member of fictional girl group I.Q.I (episode 1)
 Kwak Si-yang as Professional model (episode 5)
 Song Hae-na as Professional model (episode 5)
 Kang Ki-young as Fashion show manager (episode 5)
 Lee Yeon-soo as Park Se-gun's mother

Production 
The drama is pre-produced and a co-production between Naver and iMBC.

The director Kwon Sung-chan is known for his drama One More Happy Ending, and the drama is the second work for the screenwriter Kim A-jung, after writing the scenario for Divorce Lawyer in Love drama.

First script reading took place in October, 2016 at MBC Broadcasting Station in Sangam, South Korea.

Ratings 
 In the table below, the blue numbers represent the lowest ratings and the red numbers represent the highest ratings.
 NR denotes that the drama did not rank in the top 20 daily programs on that date.

References

External links 
 

2017 South Korean television series debuts
MBC TV television dramas
South Korean romantic fantasy television series
Korean-language television shows
Naver TV original programming
2017 South Korean television series endings